is a train station located in Biei, Hokkaidō, Japan. It is operated by the Hokkaido Railway Company. Only local trains stop. The station is assigned the station number F38.

Surrounding Area
  Route 237

Lines serviced
Furano Line

External links
Station information by JR Hokkaido Asahikawa Branch 

Railway stations in Hokkaido Prefecture
Railway stations in Japan opened in 1926
Biei, Hokkaido